The Cyclone Mark V Engine is a steam engine in which the engine, steam generator, condenser and feed pump are integrated into a single compact unit.  The company Cyclone Power Technologies of Pampano Beach, Florida was founded by inventor Harry Schoell to develop and market this engine. The Cyclone Mark V Engine is a six cylinder radial uniflow engine of two inch bore and two inch stroke.  Pistons are single acting.  The engine is claimed to produce 100 hp at 3,600 rpm using steam at 3,200 psi and 1,200 °F.

Timeline

Functional description
The Cyclone Engine is built of three major components, the Steam Generator, Piston Block, and Condenser. The working fluid, deionized water, travels continuously through these three components. Beginning in the steam generator, moving into the pistons, then to the condenser, and finally pumped back into the steam generator.

Steam generator
Steam Generator has three basic components: a coil of water tubes, surrounded by a series of burner assemblies, and covered with an insulated shroud. Each burner assembly consists of an air blower, which blows pre-heated air into the combustion chamber, a fuel atomizer, and an igniter. The blower and atomizer are arranged so that the flame front is tangential to the water-tube coils. Cyclone Power Technologies claims this arrangement allows the heavier particles in the fuel to circle the outside of the chamber until they are completely burned up, allowing for much cleaner, complete combustion of fuel, and resulting in cleaner emissions. However, they have not performed any testing to verify this theory.

The small size of the water tubes allows for much higher pressures than those of larger boilers, because of this, the water is not allowed to boil. Instead, it is allowed to reach supercritical temperature of up to 1,200 °F.

Piston assembly
The piston assembly is an even number of pistons arranged radially around a single crankshaft. The pistons are attached to the crankshaft via a special "spider" bearing. This bearing consists of several small journal bearings attached to a disk which has a larger crankshaft journal bearing in the center. Each piston has one head admission valve. This valve is actuated by a variable cam on the crankshaft, and allows for the entrance of supercritical water into the cylinder. As the supercritical water enters the cylinder it flashes into steam and pushes the piston inward, thus rotating the crankshaft.

As the piston is pushed inward, it uncovers exhaust ports in the cylinder wall. The supercritical water has now given up enough energy through expansion that it is in a vapor state. This exhaust vapor passes out of the exhaust ports in the cylinder wall and across regenerative heating coils, which are wrapped around the cylinder. The heat from the exhaust vapor is used to preheat the water in these tubes before it enters the steam generator. The vapor then passes into the condenser.

Condenser
The condenser is a stack of interleaved circular plates, with an open core containing an impeller and a condensate sump underneath it. The exhaust vapor enters the top of the condenser from the piston block and is forced by the impeller onto the sides of the condenser and into the leaves of the circular plates. On the outside of the plates, a blower circulates air around the interleaved plates. This effectively condenses the exhaust vapor, which falls into the condensate sump at the bottom of the engine. A high pressure pump then pumps the condensate out of the sump, through the regenerative heating coils around the cylinder, and back into the steam generator.

Schoell Cycle

"Schoell Cycle" is the name given by inventor Harry Schoell to his implementation of the Rankine cycle.  The primary patent for the engine calls it a "Heat regenerative engine"

In the Rankine cycle, water is pumped to high pressure, heated to produce steam, expanded in an engine producing mechanical work then heat is removed to condense the exhaust steam back into liquid water.

In the "Schoell Cycle", combustion air is first heated by passing it through the condenser, then heated further by passing it through a heat exchanger to absorb heat from the exhaust gasses.  This improves engine efficiency as less fuel needs to be burned to heat the combustion gasses to a given temperature.  This technology has been extensively used in industrial furnaces and powerplants where it is known as an air preheater or APH.

A feedwater heater is placed around each cylinder where the exhaust steam exits.  This transfers some heat to the water before it enters the steam generator, further reducing the amount of fuel necessary.

Although the Schoell patent is titled "Heat regenerative engine", it does not use the regenerative Rankine cycle nor does it use a regenerative heat exchanger.

Water lubrication
The Mark V engine's design requires the use of water to lubricate the moving parts for two reasons:
 Exhaust steam goes into the engine crankcase.  Any oil used to lubricate crankshaft and connecting rod bearings would soon form an emulsion of oil and water that would have very poor lubricating properties.
 Because of the integrated form of the Mark V and its small water capacity, any oil that enters the water will not leave the water while the engine is running.  This oil will then coat and foul the inner surfaces of the condenser and steam generator, greatly reducing their performance.  A non-integrated steam power system might have, for instance, a large water tank that will give oil time to separate from the water, or dedicated devices to separate oil from water.

Journal bearings on the crankshaft and connecting rods and the pistons sliding in their cylinders operate in the hydrodynamic lubrication regime.  The carrying capacity of a journal bearing is a direct function of the dynamic viscosity of the lubricating fluid.  Water at 20 °C has a viscosity of  0.001002 Pa·s, while a typical motor oil could have a viscosity of about 0.250 Pa·s.  Thus, water is about 250 times less effective of a lubricant than oil.

Cyclone Power Technologies had contracted with the Ohio State University Center for Automotive Research (OSU-CAR) for engineering analysis.  A March 8, 2014 presentation  by OSU-CAR described the engine bearings as a "critical path issue" and stated:
 "Little or no data exists outside Cyclone’s own experience for the use of water lubrication for either ball bearings or roller bearings in our environment and under our loadings. Calculated life using just the bearing load and the scaling factors for the viscosity of the lubricant indicate that very high ratio of load capacity to applied load is required."
 "Minimal data exists for the use of water lubricated polymer journal bearings in our environment and under our loadings. Factors of a 4:1 increase in life have been shown with submerged operation, but little long term wear data is available with pressurized water lubrication."
The contract between Cyclone Power Technologies and Phoenix Power Group for the lower output WHE steam engine states that Phoenix Power Group will make a $150,000 progress payment "Upon the completion of 200 hours of durability testing of WHE version 5.0 as conducted and/or overseen by OSU. The durability testing shall consist of the WHE engine operating, without failure, and producing 10 hp to 20 hp".  As of February 28, 2015 there has been no indication they have made a water lubricated engine pass this 200-hour endurance test.

Measured Engine Performance
Very little information has been released by Cyclone Power Technologies on actual measured performance of the Mark V.  The most detailed account comes from their Facebook page:
July 15, 2013 ·

GREAT NEWS for the Cyclone Mark V Engine

As of today! Dyno testing has recorded 100HP and 1000 ft-lb of torque. 
No other information such as engine configuration, test conditions, measurements taken, or duration of test has been reported.

Criticisms
Claims made for the Cyclone Mark V Engine include:

It's Clean: One promotional video claimed that exhaust leaving the engine would be cleaner than the air entering the engine: "The Cyclone will effectively act as an air scrubber that will help clean the air that we breath as it runs."  However, in the 2013 Annual Report, they state: "We have not yet performed this testing on our engines to meet any existing emission standards of the EPA and CARB." No source has been provided to support their claim of low or no exhaust emissions.

It's Highly Efficient: Cyclone Power Technologies claims the Mark V engine has a thermal efficiency of 33%  The source of this efficiency figure is a calculation based on a large number of assumed values.  For instance, engine power output and fuel input values are both assumed.  These give an estimated thermal efficiency of 23.2%.  It is then assumed (without supporting calculations) that the heating of the combustion air improves overall engine efficiency by 4.05% and feedwater heating improves overall engine efficiency by a further 4.32%, bringing the total estimated engine thermal efficiency to 31.57%.

Portrayal of Mock-ups as Working Engines: A number of non-functional mock-ups of the Cyclone Mark V engine and larger and smaller variants have been built by Cyclone Power Technologies as promotional displays.  The fact that they are not working engines, however, is often omitted. For instance, from various promotional videos:
"The engine has its full torque at 1 rpm."; "It has an extremely clean exhaust because it burns fuel in a centrifuge."; "The exhaust temperature is much cooler than an internal combustion engine."; "You can put your hand on this engine when it's running."; "They're very, very smooth."; "We're getting an eight percent right on top of the thermal efficiency of the engine itself."; The efficiency is "In the 30% range, plus."; "As it sits for a while it builds up a little latent heat and you can get a real high burst of acceleration."; "In normal operation you have enough acceleration to pull a pretty good load without having to have a big transmission."; "Water explodes into steam and pushes the piston down." 
"There's a small engine over here that[sic] which is one of our waste heat engines that actually operates on waste heat from one of the larger Cyclones."; "This one will put out up to a maximum of 20 horsepower."; "Or an incinerated fuel, any trash, garbage or anything else can power this system here to generate your electricity from another source."; "As in these red, domed engines around here the fuel is burned in a centrifuge."; "The final exhaust temperature on these engines is only 350 degrees."; "This engine here can actually run off the last exhaust temperature of this engine here."; "You'll see a lawnmower on the market in about a year or 18 months."; On the efficiency: "This one is about half of those."; "These engines over here run in between the efficiency of gas and the low side of diesels."; "Efficiency is not a spike, it's nearly a straight line from the time it starts until the maximum RPM."; "Of course this one here is highly efficient because it runs on free fuel."; The lawnmower engine "is totally silent." 
"This is the 330 horsepower truck version and as you can see it has a waste heat recovery system. Of course, this engine only has a 350 degree exhaust signature."; "You don't have to run around in a toy car like these golf carts some of the automobile manufacturers are proposing. Now you can have something that will really drive a machine and have some horsepower and be even cleaner that what the electric vehicles will provide.";  "As you notice it mounts into the chassis, it has no transmission because the torque level is so high."  
In none of the videos does Harry Schoell state that the engines he points to are non-functional mock-ups, nor does he say any claims of performance are predictions and are not based on any actual measurements.

Applications
As of February 13, 2016 no Mark V engines had been delivered to any customers or publicly demonstrated running.  Proposed applications included:

 A 60 kW generator set fueled by waste motor oil
 Chuk Williams' steam-powered land speed record car, followed by a land speed record car built by Cyclone Power Technologies
 A speed boat designed to break the steam-powered water speed record.
 A multi-fuel engine to provide hydraulic power to forklift trucks

However, none of these proposals have been known to be implemented.

Variants
While the Mark V engine is the basic engine described in Cyclone Power Technologies' patents, a number of smaller and larger variants have been announced at different times.

References

External links
Cyclone Power Technologies Official Website
Radio Interview With Harry Schoell

Steam engines